The 2008 Sony Ericsson WTA Tour was the elite professional tennis circuit organized by the Women's Tennis Association (WTA) for the 2008 tennis season. The 2008 WTA Tour calendar comprises the Grand Slam tournaments (supervised by the International Tennis Federation (ITF)), the WTA Tier I-IV Events, the Fed Cup (organized by the ITF), the year-end championships, and the tennis event at the Beijing Summer Olympic Games.

The season was characterised by its frequent changes in the No. 1 ranking, with Justine Henin, Maria Sharapova, Ana Ivanovic, Jelena Janković and Serena Williams all holding the position at one point during the season. Eventually Janković finished the season as the No. 1 player in the world despite not winning a Grand Slam tournament. She did however reach the final of the U.S. Open, and won four tournaments throughout the season.

Four players won the Grand Slam titles. Maria Sharapova won her third major title at the Australian Open, Ana Ivanovic won her maiden title at the French Open, Venus Williams won her seventh Grand Slam title at Wimbledon, and Serena Williams won her ninth Grand Slam title at the U.S. Open. Dinara Safina also reached her first Grand Slam final at the French Open, and won four events during the season.

One of the big stories of the year was the shock retirement of Justine Henin on May 14, less than two weeks before she was set to defend her French Open title. She became the first player to retire while ranked at No. 1 in the world. Henin later returned for the 2010 season.

Summary 
Justine Henin started the season as the No. 1 ranked player in the world. Following her impressive 2007 season and victory at the warm-up tournament in Sydney, she was considered the outright favourite to win the Australian Open. However, she was beaten in emphatic fashion by Maria Sharapova in the quarterfinals, who then defeated Jelena Janković and Ana Ivanovic to win her third Grand Slam title. Daniela Hantuchová also reached her first Grand Slam semifinal. Sister team Alona and Kateryna Bondarenko pulled off an unexpected title run in the Women's Doubles, while Sun Tiantian teamed up with Nenad Zimonjić to win her first Grand Slam tournament of any kind in the Mixed Doubles event.

Sharapova continued to impress by winning the tournament in Doha, before her 18-match win streak was snapped by Svetlana Kuznetsova in the semifinals of Indian Wells. Kuznetsova went on to lose to Ivanovic in the final. It was then the turn of Serena Williams to build a win streak, claiming the titles in Bangalore, Miami—her fifth title at the event, tying Steffi Graf for the most singles titles at this tournament—and then Charleston. Her 17-match winning run was eventually ended in Berlin by Dinara Safina, who had already beaten Henin in that tournament, and subsequently went on to lift the title.

During the Rome tournament Henin announced her shock retirement from professional tennis, becoming the first player ever to retire whilst ranked at No. 1 in the world. Henin's removal from the rankings meant that then-No. 2 Maria Sharapova became the new No. 1 by default. Jelena Janković eventually won the tournament in Rome.

With Henin's retirement the French Open was considered to be wide open. World No. 1 Sharapova was stopped by Safina in the fourth round, who fought back from match points down to win, before doing the same against Elena Dementieva in the quarterfinals. She eventually reached her first Grand Slam final. On the other side of the draw Ana Ivanovic came through after an all-Serbian semifinal with Jelena Janković, which meant that Ivanovic would move to the No. 1 position regardless of the result in the final. She ended up beating Safina for her first Slam title. In the women's doubles tournament Anabel Medina Garrigues and Virginia Ruano Pascual were victorious, the first Slam for Medina Garrigues and the tenth for Ruano Pascual. Victoria Azarenka won her second Grand Slam in the mixed doubles event.

The third Grand Slam of the year at Wimbledon brought with it some surprises: for the first time in the Open Era none of the top four seeds managed to reach the semifinals. World No. 1 Ivanovic surrendered to Zheng Jie in the third round, who went on to become the first Chinese women to reach the semifinals of a Grand Slam in singles. Tamarine Tanasugarn knocked out Janković en route to her only major quarterfinal. Sharapova was upset by Alla Kudryavtseva, and Kuznetsova lost to Agnieszka Radwańska, who had shown prior form winning the warm-up tournament in Eastbourne. Serena Williams and her sister Venus Williams reached the final, the first Grand Slam final between the two since Wimbledon five years ago. Venus would defeat her sister for her fifth Wimbledon title. They also teamed up to win the doubles title, their seventh as a team. In the mixed doubles event Samantha Stosur won with Bob Bryan.

Ivanovic lost her No. 1 ranking in August, as fellow Serbian Jelena Janković ascended to the top position for the first time. Dinara Safina proved strong on the summer hardcourts, winning titles in Los Angeles and Montréal. She then made it to the final match at the Beijing Olympics, but lost to Dementieva, who achieved her biggest career victory with the gold medal. With Vera Zvonareva also winning the bronze medal it meant that Russia swept the podium in the singles event. Li Na almost made a strong run at home, but lost in the bronze medal match. In doubles Serena and Venus Williams won their second gold medals together, after winning at the Sydney Olympics in 2000.

Ivanovic regained the No. 1 position following the Olympics, and held it heading into the U.S. Open. There it was up to grabs with five women—Ivanovic, Janković, Safina, Kuznetsova, and Serena Williams—being in contention for the top spot. Ivanovic was upset in the second round by Julie Coin, one of the worst losses for a top-ranked player ever. Serena would defeat Jelena Janković in the final. By virtue of winning her eighth major title Williams ascended to the top ranking for the first time since 2002. In the doubles tournament Cara Black and Liezel Huber won their fourth Grand Slam as a team, with Black also victorious in the mixed doubles with Leander Paes.

The fall season saw Jelena Janković return to the No. 1 position after winning events in Beijing, Stuttgart and Moscow, and thus securing the year-end No. 1 ranking. Dinara Safina won the title in Tokyo, beating Petrova and Kuznetsova en route. Both had a solid indoor season with Petrova making the final of Stuttgart and winning Quebec, and Kuznetsova finishing runner-up in Beijing and Tokyo. Vera Zvonareva also had a strong finish to the year, reaching the final of Moscow and Linz, where she lost to Ivanovic, and the WTA Tour Championships in Doha, where she lost to Venus Williams. Williams won her first title at the year-end championships. Other players at the final event were semifinalists Elena Dementieva and Jelena Janković, Dinara Safina, Serena Williams, Ana Ivanovic and Svetlana Kuznetsova, plus alternates Agnieszka Radwańska and Nadia Petrova. In the doubles event Black and Huber successfully defended the title they won in 2007.

Schedule 

The table below shows the 2008 WTA Tour schedule.

Key

January

February

March

April

May

June

July

August

September

October

November

Calendar changes 
 Prize money continued to increase to a record of approximately $67 million.
 The J&S Cup, the Acura Classic, and the PTT Bangkok Open were all removed from the calendar.
 The Bangalore Open was promoted to a Tier II event, from its former Tier III status.
 The Zurich Open was demoted from Tier I to Tier II, and the Fortis Championships Luxembourg from Tier II to Tier III, with prize money also being reduced in both events to accommodate the change in status.
 One new event was created: the Cachantún Cup, held in Viña del Mar, Chile.
 The Toray Pan Pacific Open was moved from its normal February position in the calendar to September. It also changed from an indoor event to an outdoor event.
 Fed Cup quarterfinals and semifinals were held earlier, with the final still following the U.S. Open in September.
 The Qatar Total Open was elevated from Tier II status to Tier I, with prize money increasing to $2.5 million.
 Lastly, the WTA Tour Championships were relocated from their previous location of Madrid, Spain in 2006 and 2007, to Doha, Qatar for 2008. The prize money was also raised from $3 million to $4.5 million.

Statistics

Titles information 
List of players & singles titles won, last name alphabetically:
  Jelena Janković - Rome, Beijing, Stuttgart and Moscow (4)
  Dinara Safina - Berlin, Los Angeles, Montréal and Tokyo (Tier I) (4)
  Serena Williams - Bangalore, Key Biscayne, Charleston, and US Open (4)
  Elena Dementieva - Dubai, Beijing Olympics, and Luxembourg (3)
  Ana Ivanovic - Indian Wells, French Open, and Linz (3)
  Maria Kirilenko - Estoril, Barcelona and Seoul (3)
  Agnieszka Radwańska - Pattaya, Istanbul, and Eastbourne (3)
  Maria Sharapova - Australian Open, Doha, and Amelia Island (3)
  Venus Williams - Wimbledon, Zürich, and WTA Tour Championships (3)
  Caroline Wozniacki - Stockholm, New Haven, and Tokyo (Tier III) (3)
  Lindsay Davenport - Auckland and Memphis (2)
  Sara Errani - Palermo and Portorož (2)
  Justine Henin - Sydney and Antwerp (2)
  Flavia Pennetta - Viña del Mar and Acapulco (2)
  Nadia Petrova - Cincinnati and Quebec City (2)
  Vera Zvonareva - Prague and Guangzhou (2)
  Kateryna Bondarenko - Birmingham (1)
  Anna Chakvetadze - Paris (1)
  Sorana Cîrstea - Tashkent (1)
  Alizé Cornet - Budapest (1)
  Eleni Daniilidou - Hobart (1)
  Gisela Dulko - Fes (1)
  Nuria Llagostera Vives - Bogotá (1)
  Anabel Medina Garrigues - Strasbourg (1)
  Li Na - Gold Coast (1)
  Pauline Parmentier - Bad Gastein (1)
  Lucie Šafářová - Forest Hills (1)
  Patty Schnyder - Bali (1)
  Tamarine Tanasugarn - 's-Hertogenbosch (1)
  Aleksandra Wozniak - Stanford (1)

The following players won their first title:
  Kateryna Bondarenko - Birmingham
  Alizé Cornet - Budapest
  Sara Errani - Palermo
  Caroline Wozniacki - Stockholm
  Aleksandra Wozniak - Stanford
  Sorana Cîrstea - Tashkent

Titles won by Nation
  - 18 (Australian Open, Paris, Doha, Dubai, Amelia Island, Estoril, Prague, Berlin, Barcelona, Los Angeles, Montréal, Olympics, Cincinnati, Tokyo, Guangzhou, Seoul, Luxembourg, and Quebec City)
  - 9 (Auckland, Memphis, Bangalore, Key Biscayne, Charleston, Wimbledon, US Open, Zürich, and WTA Tour Championships)
  - 7 (Indian Wells, Rome, French Open, Beijing, Stuttgart, Moscow, and Linz)
  - 4 (Viña del Mar, Acapulco, Palermo, and Portorož)
  - 3 (Stockholm, New Haven, and Tokyo (Tier III))
  - 3 (Pattaya, Istanbul, and Eastbourne)
  - 2 (Sydney and Antwerp)
  - 2 (Bogotá and Strasbourg)
  - 2 (Budapest and Bad Gastein)
  - 1 (Fes)
  - 1 (Stanford)
  - 1 (Gold Coast)
  - 1 (Forest Hills)
  - 1 (Hobart)
  - 1 (Tashkent)
  - 1 (Bali)
  - 1 ('s-Hertogenbosch)
  - 1 (Birmingham)

Rankings

Number 1 ranking

Points distribution

Awards 
The winners of the 2008 WTA Awards were announced on 25 March 2009, during a special ceremony at the Sony Ericsson Open.

 Player of the Year – Serena Williams
 Doubles Team of the Year – Cara Black & Liezel Huber
 Most Improved Player – Dinara Safina
 Comeback Player of the Year – Zheng Jie
 Newcomer of the Year – Caroline Wozniacki
 Humanitarian of the Year – Ana Ivanovic
 Karen Krantzcke Sportsmanship Award – Elena Dementieva
 Player Service Award – Liezel Huber
 Favorite Premier Tournament – Porsche Tennis Grand Prix (Stuttgart)
 Favorite International Tournament – Commonwealth Bank Tennis Classic (Bali)

See also 
 Tennis statistics
 Grand Slam (tennis)
 WTA Tour Championships
 List of WTA number 1 ranked players
 List of female tennis players
 WTA Awards
 2008 WTA Tier I Series
 2008 ATP Tour

External links 
 Women's Tennis Association (WTA) official website

References 

 
WTA Tour
2008 WTA Tour